Nader Faghihzadeh (born 1976 in Tehran) is an Iranian-German automotive designer based in Munich. He is a designer at BMW Design and was responsible for the Interior Design of the BMW 7 Series (F01/F02), the Exterior Design of the BMW 6 Series Gran Coupé, Coupé and Convertible (F06/F12/F13) and the Exterior Design of the BMW 7 series (G11/G12).

References 

Living people
German automobile designers
1976 births
BMW designers
Iranian automobile designers
Businesspeople from Tehran
Iranian emigrants to Germany
20th-century Iranian engineers